Allyltrimethylsilane is the organosilicon compound with the formula (CH3)3SiCH2CH=CH2.  The molecule consists of the trimethylsilyl group attached to allyl group.  This colorless liquid is used in organic synthesis.

References

Reagents for organic chemistry
Trimethylsilyl compounds